The North Dakota Fighting Hawks men's basketball team represents the University of North Dakota NCAA Division I men's basketball. The Fighting Hawks are members of the Summit League. Prior to membership in the Summit, they were members of Division II's North Central Conference and Division I's Great West Conference and Big Sky Conference. The current head coach is Paul Sather.

On July 1, 2018, the school officially joined the Summit League in all sports except for football, in which it remained a Big Sky member before joining the Missouri Valley Football Conference in 2020.

History
The North Dakota Men's basketball team is the fourth winningest program in the history of NCAA's Division II basketball.

Championships
North Dakota has a total of 19 regular season championships and 6 Conference tournament championships.
 
 North Central Conference
Regular Season Champion (18 times): 1927–28, 1933–34, 1934–35, 1935–36, 1936–37, 1953–54, 1954–55, 1964–65, 1965–66, 1966–67, 1973–74, 1974–75, 1975–76, 1976–77, 1981–82, 1989–90, 1990–91, 1994–95
Conference tournament champion (3 times): 1992, 1993, 1994
 Great West Conference
Conference tournament champion (2 times): 2011, 2012
 Big Sky Conference
Regular Season Champion (1 time): 2016–17
Conference tournament champion (1 time):  2017
 NCAA Division II Regionals
Elite Eight Appearances (8 times): 1965, 1966, 1975, 1976, 1977, 1982, 1990, 1991
Final Four Appearances (3 times): 1965, 1966, 1990

Postseason

Summit League Tournament results
North Dakota has appeared in 3 Summit League Tournaments, and their record is 2–3.

Division I postseason results
North Dakota has appeared in one NCAA Division I tournament. Their record is 0–1.

NCAA Division II Tournament results
North Dakota has appeared in the NCAA Division II tournament 19 times. Their combined record is 29–22.

NAIA tournament results
North Dakota has appeared in the NAIA tournament three times. Their combined record is 1–3.

CIT results
North Dakota has appeared in the CollegeInsider.com Postseason Tournament (CIT) five times. Their combined record is 0–5.

List of head coaches

Arenas
Budge Hall 1904–1905
YMCA 1906
Armory-Gym 1907–1918
New Armory 1919–1950
Hyslop Sports Center 1951–2003
Betty Engelstad Sioux Center 2004–present

NBA Draft picks
North Dakota has had four of its players selected in the NBA draft.

The following players were drafted into the NBA G League

NCC Awards

All-NCC

Walter Burkman (1923)
Arthur Busdicker (1923 and 1924)
Edmund Boe (1926 and 1927)
Albert Wild (1926)
Paul Boyd (1927 and 1929)
Victor Brown (1927-28 and 1930)
Alford Letch (1927 and 1928)
Lewis Lee (1928 and 1929)
Harold Eberly (1929)
William Lowe (1930 and 1931)
Verne DuChene (1930)
Curtis Schave (1931)
Gordon Dablow (1932–1933)
Fred Felber (1932)
Ted Meinhover (1932–34)
Bernard Smith (1932–34)
Ken Mullen (1934)
Emmet Birk (1935–37)
Weston Booth (1935)
Herman Witasek (1935 and 1936)
Robert Finnegan (1936 and 1937)
William McCosh (1938 and 1939)
Don Pepke (1939)
Bruce Stevenson (1940–42)
Dudley Draxton (1947 and 1948)

Don Meredith (1949)
Ed Weber (1949 and 1950)
Fritz Engel (1950 and 1951)
Chuck Wolfe (1951–53)
Jon Haaven (1953–54 and 1957)
Don Augustin (1954–56)
Ron Lackle (1955)
Warner Brand (1955)
Bob Hokanson (1958)
Bill Monson (1959)
Larry Exel (1960)
Prentiss Thompson (1961)
Curt Holt (1962 and 1963)
Tom Nesbitt (1964–66)
Jim Hester (1965 and 1967)
Paul Pederson (1966 and 1967)
Phil Jackson (1965–67)
Vern Praus (1968 and 1969)
Al Jenkins (1969)
Mahlon Sanders (1970 and 1971)
Chuck Dodge (1970 and 1972)
Craig Skarperud (1972)
Jim Goodrich (1974 and 1976)
Don Gunhus (1974)
Mark Lindahl (1975 and 1976)

Jim Goodrich (1976)
Fred Lukens (1977)
Chris Fahrbach (1977–79)
Todd Bakken (1980)
Aaron Harris (1981 and 1982)
Dan Clausen (1981 and 1982)
Steve Brekke (1982 and 1983)
Roland Jacobs (1985)
Steve Staver (1987)
Dave Vonesh (1988 and 1990–91)
Mike Boschee (1989)
Scott Guldseth (1991–93)
Chris Gardner (1992 and 1994)
Todd Johnson (1993–95)
Travis Tuttle (1995–97)
Frank Iverson (1996)
Hunter Berg (1998 and 1999)
Chad Mustard (2000)
Hunter Reinke (2000)
Kyle Behrens (2001)
Jerome Beasley (2002 and 2003)
Jeff Brandt (2002)
Evan Lindahl (2004 and 2006)
Todd Rypkema (2004 and 2005)
Emmanuel Little (2007 and 2008)

NCC MVPs
 Chuck Wolfe (1953)
 Jon Haaven (1954)
 Don Augustin (1955)
 Phil Jackson (1966 and 1967)
 Al Jenkins (1969)
 Dan Clausen (1982)
 Dave Vonesh (1990 and 1991)
 Scott Guldseth (1993)
 Kyle Behrens (2001)
 Jerome Beasley (2002 and 2003)

Defensive Player of the Year
 Rico Burkett (1991)
 Frank Iverson (1996)
 Harry Boyce (2007)

Newcomer of the Year
 Broderick Powell (1992)
 Jerome Beasley (2002)

Freshman of the Year
 Jeff Brandt (2001)

NCC All-Freshman Team
 Chris Gardner (1991)
 Todd Johnson (1992)
 Travis Tuttle (1993)
 Brian Ehrp (1994)
 Dale Aue (1995)

Academic All-NCC
 Fred Lukens (1975–77)
 Doug Moe (1979–81)
 Todd Bakken (1979–81)
 Jon Sonat (1982)
 Mark Basco (1986)
 Pete Stewart (1987)
 Scott Guldseth (1992 and 1993)
 Ben Jacobson (1993)
 Travis Tuttle (1997)
 Blaine Ristvedt (2000)
 Kyle Behrens (2001)
 Steve Bradley (2005)
 Todd Rypkema (2005)
 Josh Doyle (2006–08)
 Jimmy Hoy (2006 and 2008)
 Derek Benter (2008)
 Tyler Koenig (2008)

Great West Awards

First Team All-Great West
Travis Bledsoe (2010)

Second Team All-Great West
Troy Huff (2011 and 2012)
Patrick Mitchell (2012)

All-Tournament team
 Patrick Mitchell (2011**)
 Troy Huff (2011 and 2012)
 Jamal Webb (2012**)

* = Tournament MVP

Academic All-Great West
 Derek Benter (2009)
 Daniel Haskins (2009)
 Dustin Monsebroten (2009)

Big Sky Awards

First Team All-Big Sky
Troy Huff (2013 and 2014)
Quinton Hooker (2016 and 2017)

Second Team All-Big Sky
Aaron Anderson (2013)
Geno Crandall (2017 and 2018)

All-Tournament team
 Troy Huff (2013 and 2014)
 Quinton Hooker (2016 and 2017**)
 Corey Baldwin (2017)

** = Tournament MVP

Reserve of the Year
 Jamal Webb (2014)
 Cortez Seales (2017)

Academic All-Big Sky
 Chad Calcaterra (2014)
 Dustin Hobaugh (2015 and 2016)
 Conner Avants (2016 and 2018)
 Dale Jones (2018)

Summit League Awards

First Team All-Summit League
Marlon Stewart (2020)

Second Team All-Summit League
Filip Rebraca (2020 and 2021)

All-Tournament team
Marlon Stewart (2020)

Freshman of the Year
Tyree Ihenacho (2021)
Paul Bruns (2022)

All Time Statistical Leaders

Single-game leaders
 Points: Henry (Doc) O'Keefe (56, 1908)
 Assists: Doug Moe (14, 1979)
 Rebounds: Don Augustin (32, 1955)
 Steals: Dave Vonesh (9, 1990)
 3 point FG made: Travis Tuttle (10, 1994), Patrick Mitchell (10, 2010)
 Free Throws made: Phil Jackson (23, 1967)

Single-season leaders
 Points: Dave Vonesh (788, 1989–90)
 Assists: Rico Burkett (232, 1989–90)
 Rebounds: Dave Vonesh (410, 1989–90)
 Steals: Troy Huff (79, 2013–14)
 Blocks: Chris Gardner (93, 1991–93)
 FG made: Dave Vonesh (303, 1989–90)
 3 point FG made: Travis Tuttle (102, 1994–95)
 Free Throws Made: (208, Phil Jackson)

Career leaders
 Points: Scott Guldseth (2190, 1989–93)
 Assists: Burke Barlow (595, 1993–95)
 Rebounds: Dave Vonesh (1207, 1987–91)
 Steals: Jamal Webb (240, 2010–14)
 Blocks: Chris Gardner (313, 1990–94)
 FG made: Scott Guldseth (806, 1989–93)
 3 point FG made: Travis Tuttle (350, 1993–97)
 Free Throws made: Dave Vonesh (507, 1987–91)
 Games Played: Aaron Anderson (133, 2010–14)

References

External links